Shanise Foster (born 3 September 1993) is a Jamaican footballer who plays as a midfielder for Arnett Gardens FC and the Jamaica women's national team.

College career
Foster attended Navarro College in the United States. She was supposed to join South Florida Bulls for the 2015 season, but ultimately did not happen.

International career
Foster represented Jamaica at two CONCACAF Women's U-17 Championship editions (2008 and 2010) and the 2010 CONCACAF Women's U-20 Championship. She made her senior debut during the 2016 CONCACAF Women's Olympic Qualifying Championship qualification in a 6–0 win over the Dominican Republic on August 23, 2015.

International goals
Scores and results list Jamaica's goal tally first

References

1993 births
Living people
Jamaican women's footballers
Sportspeople from Kingston, Jamaica
Women's association football midfielders
Women's association football defenders
Navarro Bulldogs soccer players
College women's soccer players in the United States
Jamaica women's international footballers
Jamaican expatriate women's footballers
Jamaican expatriate sportspeople in the United States
Expatriate women's soccer players in the United States